The Gaspé Peninsula, also known as Gaspesia, is a peninsula along the south shore of the Saint Lawrence River that extends from the Matapedia Valley in Quebec, Canada, into the Gulf of Saint Lawrence.  It is separated from New Brunswick on its southern side by  Chaleur Bay and the Restigouche River. The name Gaspé comes from the Miꞌkmaq word , meaning "end", referring to the end of the land.

The population is 140,599 as of the 2011 census. It is also noted as being the only region outside the Channel Islands to contain native speakers of Jersey Norman.

Geography
Sea cliffs dominate the peninsula's northern shore along the St. Lawrence River.   Cap Gaspé, jutting into the Gulf of St. Lawrence, is the easternmost point of the peninsula.  Percé Rock (or Rocher Percé), an island pierced by a natural arch, is located just offshore of the peninsula's eastern end.  The peninsula's interior is a rugged northward continuation of the Appalachian Mountains called the Chic-Chocs, with Mont Jacques-Cartier at  the peninsula's highest peak.

Its summit, an alpine area above the tree line, is a nearly flat plateau about 13 km (8 mi) across composed of serpentine bedrock and supporting a quite unusual flora. The ascent of Mount Albert from near sea level is challenging, but popular with hikers, offering a view of the St. Lawrence and the Côte-Nord, the river's north shore, part of the ancient bedrock of the Canadian Shield.

Inland 
The interior portions of the peninsula are dominated by the Chic-Choc Mountains, part of the Notre Dame Mountains, an extension of the Appalachian Mountains.

It is reached by Route 198, which extends inland from the northern shore of the peninsula, soon climbing into the mountains and entering vast forests, crossing several small rivers before reaching the town. From Murdochville, Route 198 follows the York River to the city of Gaspé on the peninsula's eastern tip.

Economy
The economy of the peninsula has historically been focused on fishing, agriculture and forestry. However, primary resource based industries are suffering due to overfishing, overexploitation and fewer numbers of farmers in business, forcing the region to move towards tourism and the services industry.

Tourism

The peninsula is one of Quebec's most popular tourism regions. The Gaspé National Park (Parc national de la Gaspésie) is located in the Chic-Chocs, and Forillon National Park is at the peninsula's northeastern tip. A section of the International Appalachian Trail travels through the peninsula's mountains. Bonaventure National Park is located here.  As of September 2018 the area also hosts Canada's third UNESCO Global Geopark - Géoparc de Percé.

Infrastructure

Roads

 Quebec Route 132 circles the peninsula, with one branch following the coast and the other cutting across it at Sainte-Flavie.

See also
 Gaspé, Quebec
 Percé, Quebec
 Maritime Quebec
 Maritime Peninsula
 List of people from the Gaspé Peninsula
 List of regions of Quebec
 Acadia (region)

References

External links

 Municipalities and cities of Gaspé region 
 Tourism Gaspésie
 

 
Canada geography articles needing translation from French Wikipedia
Peninsulas of Quebec